Thrissur  Development Authority (TDA) was a statutory body overseeing the development of the City of Thrissur and Thrissur Metropolitan Area in the state of Kerala, India. K Radhakrishnan was the last Chairman of Thrissur Development Authority.

History
In 1981 the Government of Kerala constituted Thrissur Urban Development Authority (TUDA) under Town Planning Act. It came into existence on till June 1983. In 2007, the Government of Kerala dissolved the authority. Later in 2012, the authority was again reconstituted by the Government of Kerala. In 8 April 2013, Government of Kerala had appointed K Radhakrishnan as Chairman of Development Authority and Renamed as Thrissur Development Authority (TDA). In 2016, Kerala Government disbanded Thrissur Development Authority.

References

State agencies of Kerala
Government of Thrissur
Organisations based in Thrissur
State urban development authorities of India
1981 establishments in Kerala
Government agencies established in 1981
Government agencies disestablished in 2016
2016 disestablishments in India